Nisshin, Nissin (pronounced the same, written as 日清, 日新, 日真, etc. in Japanese) may refer to:

Geography
 日進市: Nisshin, Aichi, a city in Aichi Prefecture, Japan, near the city of Nagoya
 日進村: Nisshin, Saitama, a former town that is now Kita ward of the city of Saitama, Saitama

Companies
Several unrelated companies:

日清
 Nissin Foods, worldwide instant ramen maker
 Nisshin Seifun Group
 Nisshinbo Industries, maker of car brakes

日新
 Nisshin Steel

日信
 Nissin Kogyo, maker of car brakes, a Honda keiretsu company

日伸
 Nisshin Onpa, maker of guitar effects under the Maxon brand

Other uses
 日親: Nisshin (monk) (1407–1488)
 日真: the name of several monks of Nichiren Buddhism and Nichiren Shoshu
 日進: name given to several ships of the Imperial Japanese Navy, including:
 Japanese cruiser Nisshin that served in the Battle of Tsushima
 Japanese seaplane carrier Nisshin that was sunk in the Bougainville Strait in July 1943
 Nisshin (Japanese warship), launched in 1869

See also
 日新丸: Nisshin Maru, a Japanese whaling ship that was targeted by activist group Sea Shepherd in February 2007